The 2014 South American Basketball Championship was the 46th edition of the South American Basketball Championship. Eight teams featured the competition, held in Isla Margarita, Venezuela from 24 to July 28. Argentina was the defending champion. The first three places qualified for the 2015 Pan-American Games, with the top four teams qualifying for the 2015 FIBA Americas Championship.

Preliminary round

Group A 

All times local (UTC-04:30)

Group B 

All times local (UTC-04:30)

Knockout round

5th place bracket

Classification 5–8

Semifinals

Seventh place match

Fifth place match

Third place match

Final

Final standings

References

External links
 Official website 

South American Basketball Championship
2014–15 in South American basketball
2014 in Venezuelan sport
International basketball competitions hosted by Venezuela